Podvysoká is a village and municipality in Čadca District in the Žilina Region of northern Slovakia.

History
In the village was built in 1658.

Geography
The municipality lies at an altitude of 460 metres and covers an area of 5.609 km2. It has a population of about 1210 people. The village lies near the border with Poland and the Czech Republic

External links
http://www.statistics.sk/mosmis/eng/run.html

Villages and municipalities in Čadca District